The 2011 Copa do Brasil de Futebol Feminino was the fifth staging of the competition. The competition started on August 18, 2011, and concluded on November 26, 2011. 32 clubs of all regions of Brazil participated of the cup, which is organized by the Brazilian Football Confederation (CBF).

Foz Cataratas won the final 2–0 and 3–0 over Vitória-PE and represented Brazil in the 2012 Copa Libertadores Femenina.

Competition format
The competition was contested by 32 clubs in a knock-out format where all rounds were played over two legs and the away goals rule was used, but in the first three rounds, if the away team won the first leg with an advantage of at least three goals, the second leg would not be played and the club automatically qualified to the next round.

Table

Semifinals

Final

References

External links
Official website

2011
2011 domestic association football cups
2011 Brazilian football competitions
Copa